The 2010–11 UNAM season was the 64th professional season of Mexico's top-flight football league. The season is split into two tournaments—the Torneo Apertura and the Torneo Clausura—each with identical formats and each contested by the same eighteen teams. UNAM began their season on 25 July 2010 against Toluca, UNAM played their homes games on Sundays at noon local time.

Torneo Apertura

Squad

Regular season

Final Phase 

UNAM won 3–2 on aggregate

Monterrey won 2–0 on aggregate

Goalscorers

Transfers

In

Out

Regular season statistics

Results summary

Results by round

Torneo Clausura

Squad

Regular season

Goalscorers

Regular season statistics

Results summary

Results by round

References 

2010–11 Primera División de México season
Mexican football clubs 2010–11 season